Tartary or Tatary was a blanket term used in Western European literature and cartography for a vast part of Asia bounded by the Caspian Sea, the Ural Mountains, the Pacific Ocean, and the northern borders of China, India and Persia, at a time when this region was largely unknown to European geographers. 

The active use of the toponym (place name) can be traced from the 13th to the 19th centuries. In European sources, Tartary became the most common name for Central Asia that had no connection with the real polities or ethnic groups of the region; until the 19th century, European knowledge of the area remained extremely scarce and fragmentary. In modern English-speaking tradition, the region formerly known as Tartary is usually called Inner or Central Eurasia. Much of this area consists of arid plains, the main nomadic population of which in the past was engaged in animal husbandry.

Ignorance surrounding Tartary's use as a place name has spawned conspiracy theories including ideas of a "hidden past" and "mud floods". Such theories assert that Tartary (or "Tartaria") was a lost civilization with advanced technology and culture. This ignores the well-documented history of Asia, which Tartary refers to. In the present day, the Tartary region covers a region spanning from central Afghanistan to northern Kazakhstan, as well as areas in present Mongolia, China and the Russian Far East in "Chinese Tartary".

Geography and history 

Knowledge of Manchuria, Siberia and Central Asia in Europe prior to the 18th century was limited. The entire area was known simply as "Tartary" and its inhabitants "Tartars". In the early modern period, as understanding of the geography increased, Europeans began to subdivide Tartary into sections with prefixes denoting the name of the ruling power or the geographical location. Thus, Siberia was Great Tartary or Russian Tartary, the Crimean Khanate was Little Tartary, Manchuria was Chinese Tartary, and western Central Asia (prior to becoming Russian Central Asia) was known as Independent Tartary. By the seventeenth century, however, largely under the influence of Catholic missionary writings, the word "Tartar" came to refer to the Manchus and the lands they ruled as "Tartary".

European opinions of the area were often negative, and reflected the legacy of the Mongol invasions that originated from this region. The term originated in the wake of the widespread devastation spread by the Mongol Empire. The adding of an extra "r" to "Tatar" was suggestive of Tartarus, a Hell-like realm in Greek mythology. In the 18th century, conceptions of Siberia or Tartary and its inhabitants as "barbarous" by Enlightenment-era writers tied into contemporary concepts of civilization, savagery and racism.

More positive opinions were also expressed by Europeans. Some saw Tartary as a possible source of spiritual knowledge lacking in contemporary European society. In Five Years of Theosophy, edited by the Theosophist and scholar G.R.S. Mead, the polymath and "seer" Emanuel Swedenborg is quoted as having advised, "Seek for the Lost Word among the hierophants of Tartary, China, and Tibet."

Decline 
The use of "Tartary" declined as the region became more known to European geographers; however, the term was still used long into the 19th century. Ethnographical data collected by Jesuit missionaries in China contributed to the replacement of "Chinese Tartary" with Manchuria in European geography by the early 18th century. The voyages of Egor Meyendorff and Alexander von Humboldt into this region gave rise to the term Central Asia in the early 19th century as well as supplementary terms such as Inner Asia, and Russian expansionism led to the term "Siberia" being coined for the Asian half of the Russian Empire.

By the 20th century, Tartary as a term for Siberia and Central Asia was obsolete. However, it lent the title to Peter Fleming's 1936 book News from Tartary, which detailed his travels in Central Asia.

Tartaria conspiracy theory 
The theory of Great Tartaria as a suppressed lost land or civilization originated in Russia, with aspects first appearing in Anatoly Fomenko’s New chronology, and then popularized by the racial occult history of Nikolai Levashov. In Russian pseudoscience, known for its nationalism, Tartaria is presented as the "real" name for Russia, which was maliciously "ignored" in the West. The Russian Geographical Society has debunked the conspiracy theory as an extremist fantasy, and far from denying the existence of the term, has used the opportunity to share numerous maps of "Tartary" in its collection. Since about 2016, conspiracy theories about the supposed lost empire of "Tartaria" have gained popularity on the Internet, divorced from its original Russian nationalist frame.

The globalized version of the conspiracy theory is based on an alternative view of architectural history. Adherents propose that demolished buildings such as the Singer Building, the original New York Penn Station, or the temporary grounds of the 1915's World's Fair were actually the buildings of a vast empire based in Tartary that has been suppressed from history. Sumptuously styled Gilded Age buildings are often held out as really having been built by the supposed Tartaria. Other buildings, such as the Great Pyramids and the White House, are further held out as Tartarian buildings. The conspiracy theory only vaguely describes how such a supposedly advanced civilization which had reputedly achieved world peace could have fallen and been hidden.

In the conspiracy theory, the idea that a "mud flood" wiped out much of the world via depopulation and thus old buildings is common, supported by the fact that many buildings across the world have architectural elements like doors, windows and archways submerged many feet below "ground level". Both World War I and II are cited as a way in which Tartaria was destroyed and hidden, reflecting the reality that the extensive bombing campaigns of World War II did destroy many historic buildings. The general evidence for the theory is that there are similar styles of building around the world, such as capitol buildings with domes, or star forts. Also many photographs from the turn of the 20th century appear to show deserted city streets in many capital cities across the world. When people do start to appear in the photographs there is a striking contrast between the horse and cart dwellers in the muddy streets and the elaborate, highly ornate stone mega-structures which tower above the inhabitants of the cities, which is seen even in modern cities where extreme poverty is contrasted with skyscrapers. 

Zach Mortice writing for Bloomberg believes that the theory reflects a cultural discontent with modernism, and a supposition that traditional styles are inherently good and modern styles are bad. He describes the theory as "the QAnon of architecture".

See also 
 Chinese Tartary
 Cossack
 Golden Horde
 Khanate of Crimea
 Mongol Empire
 Tatars
 Tatarstan

References

Citations

Sources

External links 

 1704 map of Tartary
 1736 map of Tartary showing Muscovite, Independent, and Chinese Tartary
 Nationality of Religion? Views of Central Asian Islam
 Tatary – English World dictionary

Historical regions
Geography of Russia
History of Central Asia
East Asia
Mongol states
Exonyms
Pseudohistory
Cartography